Pierre Pasquier (14 September 1902 – 1986) was a French violist.

Born in Tours, Pasquier was a student of Maurice Vieux. He obtained his first prize in viola in 1922. He founded the trio Pasquier with his brothers Jean and Étienne, as soon as he came out of the Conservatoire de Paris, in 1927.

At the same time, his career as an international soloist was complemented by that of an orchestral musician and music educator. Appointed a professor of chamber music at the Conservatoire in 1943, he trained many students who distinguished themselves by their exceptional musical sense.

Since childhood, Pierre Pasquier also showed a real talent for caricature as a cartoonist.

His son Bruno Pasquier is also a violist. His other son Régis Pasquier is a violinist.

Pierre Pasquier died in Neuilly-sur-Seine in 1986.

References

External links 
 Pierre Pasquier on Encyclopédie Larousse
 Pierre Pasquier on IdRef
 MPierre Pasquier on Discogs
 Mozart ; Flute Quartet in A K.298_Rene Le Roy(Fl) & Pasquier Trio on YouTube

French classical violists
Conservatoire de Paris alumni
Academic staff of the Conservatoire de Paris
Musicians from Tours, France
1902 births
1986 deaths
20th-century classical musicians
20th-century violists